Qazi Kalayeh (also Romanized as Qāẕī Kalāyeh) is a village in Ziaran Rural District, in the Central District of Abyek County, Qazvin Province, Iran. At the 2006 census, its population was 71, in 32 families.

References 

Populated places in Abyek County